City Slab Horror is the fifth studio album by the Australian experimental pop music group Severed Heads. First released in 1985 through Ink Records, it is the second major label album the group has ever released, following the 1983 album Since the Accident. The track "Goodbye Tonsils" was released as a single to promote the album, which met favorable reviews from some critics and no reviews at all from the vast majority of the remaining critics.

Reception

Andy Hurt of Sounds magazine wrote that it is "one of the most accomplished, complete works in recent years" and gave the record 4.5 stars out of five. Another reviewer commented that "with [City Slab Horror], the Heads have cemented their place at the forefront of the electronic experimentalists".

Track listing
All songs written by Paul Deering and Tom Ellard unless indicated.
Original LP release: UK (Ink, INK 9)

Nettwerk/Volition reissue: City Slab Horror (With Tracks from Blubberknife) - 1983-1984 Part 2 (1989, Canada, W2-30033/VOLT 20/2 (CD), W4-30033 (cassette)) bonus tracks

One run of the CDs erroneously printed Since the Accident on the spines.  Only track 13 was originally released on the 1982 cassette Blubberknife.  "Power Circles" was previously released as "Power" on Ellard's 1983 solo cassette Snappy Carrion, and then as its new title on the 1985 2LP compilation Clifford Darling Please Don't Live in the Past.  15-17 are the B-side tracks of the "Goodbye Tonsils" 12" single.
Sevcom reissue CD-R (2004, Australia)/Bandcamp downloads bonus tracks

13-16 are from the "Goodbye Tonsils" 12" single.
Sevcom reissue CD-R bonus disc VB Slab Error (2004, Australia)/Bandcamp downloads bonus tracks

4 & 5 are excerpts of the Nothing on 45 performance on 2MBS-FM, December 2, 1983, which was released on the two-cassette compilation Lunokhod.  10 was previously released on the "Gashing the Old Mae West (Marathon Mix)" 12" single.  The rest of the songs were previously unreleased.
In 2014, the American label Medical Records LLC reissued the LP in an edition of 1000 copies on "bone-white" colored vinyl (MR-035).

Personnel
Tom Ellard - recording, mixing, self importance, sequencing, tapes, drum programming
Garry Bradbury - recording, sequencing, drum programming, tapes
Paul Deering - recording, drum programming, sequencing, tapes
Stephen Jones - video synthesizers
Topsy Keevil - production
Margaret Woods - recording
Mark Town & Country Plan - artwork

References

External links
 
 Bandcamp page

Severed Heads albums
1985 albums